The 2000 St. Petersburg Open was a tennis tournament played on indoor carpet courts at the Petersburg Sports and Concert Complex in Saint Petersburg in Russia and was part of the ATP International Series of the 2000 ATP Tour. The tournament ran from November 6 through November 12, 2000.

Finals

Singles

 Marat Safin defeated  Dominik Hrbatý 2–6, 6–4, 6–4
 It was Safin's 6th title of the year and the 7th of his career.

Doubles

 Daniel Nestor /  Kevin Ullyett defeated  Thomas Shimada /  Myles Wakefield 7–6(7–5), 7–5
 It was Nestor's 3rd title of the year and the 15th of his career. It was Ullyett's 3rd title of the year and the 10th of his career.

External links
 Official website  
 Official website 
 ATP Tournament Profile

St. Petersburg Open
St. Petersburg Open
St. Petersburg Open
St. Petersburg Open